Daniel Holloway (born May 21, 1987) is an American cyclist, who previously rode for American amateur team Texas Roadhouse Racing. Holloway specialized in criteriums, track racing and six-day racing. During his career, Holloway has won over 20 national titles, a Pan American title in 2018 and a gold medal at the 2019 Pan American Games. On June 2, 2021, Daniel Holloway announced his retirement from professional cycling.

Career

Early life and junior career
Holloway was born on May 21, 1987, in Wichita Falls, Texas, and began as a speed skater. He began cycling as practice for speed skating in the summer. His racing career began on the velodrome due to its similarities with the track. Holloway took to cycling winning his first national championship in July 2004 in the Madison. In 2005 he won his next national title at Junior Track Nationals in the individual and team pursuits. In 2007 he took his first Criterium National title as an amateur.

Amateur and professional career
In 2008, he rode to 4 Elite National titles on the track, winning the team pursuit, madison, points race and the scratch. He joined the  team as a stagiaire, before joining the  team for the 2009 season. Holloway won the kilo and points race titles at the National Track Championships, and he also competed at the 2009 UCI Track Cycling World Championships in Poland with teammates Colby Pearce and Taylor Phinney. In 2010 Holloway joined the domestic  team and raced predominately on the road, winning his first United States National Criterium Championships. In 2011, Holloway joined the UCI Continental team  further focusing on road racing with a specialty in criteriums.

Holloway joined  in 2012, where he again won the scratch at the National Track Championships. Holloway won a record 21 races in 2014 with Athlete Octane, including his second criterium title at the National Amateur Road Championships. Riding for Alto Velo p/b Seasucker in 2015, Holloway extended his record to 26 victories, and a second consecutive criterium title at the National Amateur Road Championships. In 2016, Holloway took his third consecutive criterium title at the National Amateur Road Championships, and also won the road race title for Intelligentsia Coffee. He also raced his first ever Red Hook Criterium Series, placing 5th at his first attempt at Red Hook Brooklyn.

Holloway moved to Texas Roadhouse Racing for the 2017 season, where he won a second consecutive road race title at the National Amateur Road Championships. Towards the end of his 2017 road season, Holloway shifted focus back to the track, winning 2 National titles (Omnium and Madison) and a World Cup (Omnium) on the track, and three National titles (Omnium, Madison, Points race) as well as the Pan-American Madison Championship title in 2018. In addition to Texas Roadhouse, Daniel Holloway was named an official member of Team USA's track cycling endurance program.

Personal life
Daniel Holloway is married to creative director, entrepreneur, and owner of Kombucha and seltzer brand Drink Mortal, Becca Schepps.

Major victories

2005
 1st Stage 3 Tour de l'Abitibi
 National Junior Track Championships
1st  Individual pursuit
1st  Team pursuit
2006
 1st Overall Tulsa Tough
2007
 1st  Criterium, National Amateur Road Championships
2008
 National Track Championships
1st  Team pursuit (with Taylor Phinney, Colby Pearce & Dave Koesel)
1st  Madison (with Colby Pearce)
1st  Scratch
1st  Under-23 points race
 Tour of Pennsylvania
1st Stages 1b & 6
2009
 Vuelta a Palencia
1st Stages 1 & 6
 National Track Championships
1st  Points race
1st  Kilo
2010
 1st  Criterium, National Road Championships
 1st TD Bank Mayor's Cup
2012
 1st Stage 6 Vuelta Mexico Telmex
 1st  Scratch, National Track Championships
2014
 1st  Criterium, National Amateur Road Championships
 1st Athens Twilight Criterium
2015
 1st  Criterium, National Amateur Road Championships
 1st Overall USA Crits Series
1st Athens Twilight Criterium
1st Tulsa Tough
1st Gateway Cup
2016
 National Amateur Road Championships
1st  Criterium
1st  Road race
 1st Tulsa Tough
 Red Bull Last Stand
1st Double Down Award
2nd Geared race
2017
 1st  Road race, National Amateur Road Championships
 National Track Championships
1st  Team pursuit
1st  Madison (with Adrian Hegyvary)
1st  Omnium
 1st Omnium, 2017–18 UCI Track Cycling World Cup, Santiago
 2nd Omnium, UCI C1 Troféu Internacional de Anadia
 2nd Omnium, UCI C1 Track Cycling Challenge Switzerland
2018
 1st Madison, Pan American Track Championships (with Adrian Hegyvary)
 National Track Championships
1st  Omnium
1st  Madison (with Adrian Hegyvary)
1st  Points race
 1st Madison, Japan Track Cup I
 1st Handicap Madison – Chase, Six Days of Copenhagen
 3rd Madison, 2018–19 UCI Track Cycling World Cup, Milton (with Adrian Hegyvary)
2019
 1st  Madison, National Track Championships (with Adrian Hegyvary)
 2nd Madison, Pan American Track Championships (with Adrian Hegyvary)
 2nd Madison, Super Tuesday 
 3rd Madison, 2018–19 UCI Track Cycling World Cup, Cambridge (with Adrian Hegyvary)
 3rd Madison, 2018–19 Six Day Series, Hong Kong

References

External links

1987 births
Living people
American male cyclists
People from Morgan Hill, California
Pan American Games medalists in cycling
Pan American Games gold medalists for the United States
Cyclists at the 2019 Pan American Games
Medalists at the 2019 Pan American Games
21st-century American people
American track cyclists